This is a list of notable companies based in Ireland, or subsidiaries according to their sector. It includes companies from the entire island. The state of the Republic of Ireland covers five-sixths of the island, with Northern Ireland, part of the United Kingdom, covering the remainder in the north-east. Each has separate regulatory and registration authorities.

About companies in Ireland
Irish companies fall into three categories:

 Private limited companies, which carry the suffix "Limited" (Ltd) or "Teoranta" (Teo), and whose shares are privately held.
 Public limited companies, which carry the suffix "plc" or "" and whose shares may be listed on a stock exchange. Where this is the case, it is noted in this article.
 Company limited by guarantee, this type of company has members, not shareholders, as such generally limited to trade associations and not-for-profit bodies.

Companies in the Republic of Ireland must be registered with the Companies Registration Office, and comply with the provisions of the Companies Acts. Companies in Northern Ireland must be registered with the Department for the Economy's Companies Registry. Certain Northern Ireland organisations are dealt with on a UK-wide basis and are dealt with by Companies House.

Some entries on this list may be statutory corporations - a business form governed by a board appointed by an Irish Government minister under a particular piece of legislation - not formally companies as such, but are effectively treated as such and are included on this list as they are usually large business. For more details on this form of governance, see state-sponsored bodies of Ireland.

Some mutual bodies, such as building societies, are also included on this list.

Some entries such as Three Ireland and Intel Ireland are subsidiaries of foreign companies. These subsidiaries are listed because the Irish economy is significantly dependent on foreign companies in comparison to other nations and these multinational companies are major Irish employers and tax contributors - Intel Ireland employs over 5000 people.

Largest firms 

This list shows firms in the Fortune Global 500, which ranks firms by total revenues reported before 31 March 2017. Only the top five firms (if available) are included as a sample.

Notable firms 
This list includes notable companies with primary headquarters located in the country. The industry and sector follow the Industry Classification Benchmark framework. Organizations which have ceased operations are included and noted as defunct.

See also 
 Celtic Tiger
 Communications in Ireland
 Companies Registration Office
 IDA Ireland
 Irish Stock Exchange
 Media of Ireland
 Transport in Ireland

References 

Ireland